Helene Bielansky (born 19 March 1931) is an Austrian hurdler. She competed in the women's 80 metres hurdles at the 1952 Summer Olympics.

References

External links
 

1931 births
Possibly living people
Athletes (track and field) at the 1952 Summer Olympics
Austrian female hurdlers
Olympic athletes of Austria
Place of birth missing (living people)